Raphael Throckmorton (1632–1709) was an Anglican priest who served as Archdeacon of Lincoln from 1645 until his death.

Throckmorton was born in South Ormsby and educated at Christ Church, Oxford. He received the degree of Doctor of Divinity (DD). He held livings at Swaby and South Ormsby; and was buried at St Andrew Holborn in the City of London.

References

1667 deaths
Alumni of Christ Church, Oxford
Archdeacons of Lincoln
People from Lincolnshire
1632 births